The Northrop AGM-137 TSSAM (Tri-Service Standoff Attack Missile) was a standoff cruise missile developed for the three branches of the United States Armed Forces, hence "tri-service". Missile development began in 1986 but revelation of cost-overruns in 1991 prompted the Army to pull out of the project and an investigation of the procurement process by the General Accounting Office (GAO, now referred to as the Government Accountability Office). The project was eventually cancelled in 1994 pursuant to a GAO recommendation and the loss of support of the United States Army.

Development

The United States Air Force began developing the Tri-Service Standoff Attack Missile (TSSAM) in 1986; the intent was to produce a family of stealthy missiles for the U.S. Air Force, Navy and United States Army which would be capable of long range, autonomous guidance, automatic target recognition, and sufficient accuracy and warhead power to be capable of destroying well-protected structures either on land or at sea.

All versions of the missile would use inertial navigation aided by Global Positioning System (GPS). The Navy and one Air Force version were to use an imaging infrared homing terminal sensor to recognize the target and terminal homing, and would be fitted with a unitary warhead. A second version Army missile would be launched by two booster rockets and carry the Combined Effects Bomblet (CEB) submunition against land targets.

It was planned to carry the missile on the B-52H, F-16C/D, B-1, B-2, A-6E, and F/A-18C/D; the Army version was to be launched from the MLRS (Multiple Launch Rocket System) vehicle.

In 1991 the previously black budget figures for TSSAM were revealed, showing a roughly 6 billion dollar cost overrun over the original contract price. This prompted a GAO investigation into the procurement process which resulted in the recommendation that the project be cancelled.

The project suffered from budgetary problems, some related to the distribution of the budget between the three services. This resulted in funding shortfalls and delays. The missiles also suffered from technical development issues, pushing the unit cost from the original 1986 figure of $728,000 per missile to $2,062,000 in 1994. The project which was intended to be used by all three services (hence, Tri-service), lost Army support in 1993 and was canceled as a result. Technology developed for the TSSAM was used in the JASSM program.

See also
 List of missiles

References

External links 
 Northrop AGM/MGM-137 TSSAM - Designation Systems

AGM-137
Abandoned military rocket and missile projects of the United States